The Eblana Theatre was situated in the basement of Busáras, Dublin's central bus station, operated by Bus Éireann. A small theatre, seating 225-240 people, it was noted for being without wings and other common aspects of theatrical architecture, having been adapted from a short-lived newsreel cinema intended to entertain waiting bus passengers.
It was open from 17 September 1959 until 1995.

Establishment
The location that became the Eblana Theatre was initially intended as a small cinema for newsreel presentations, for the entertainment of waiting bus passengers, and operated in this role for around two years. Then in 1958 the lease was acquired by Phyllis Ryan was run by her and some associates (including Des Nealon) as a conventional theatre, and home to her company Gemini Productions. It opened in 1959 during the Dublin Theatre Festival. The inclusion of the theatre space was part of the concept of Busáras being a multi-use public building. It was the original newsreel cinema purpose that led to the theatre having no wings, which made mounting large plays or complex sets impossible.

The modest scale of the theatre, and its proximity to the public toilets of the bus station, were a source of some derision, with claims that it was "The only public toilet in Dublin with its own theatre" — though in fact only the Ladies toilet was close to the theatre, the Gents being some distance away. Performances were occasionally enlivened by lost passengers seeking the lavatories.

Associations
Ryan was in the 1960s and 1970s the major producer of new plays in Ireland outside of the Abbey Theatre. Phyllis Ryan and her Gemini Productions kept independent theatre alive in Dublin and premièred most of the work of playwright John B. Keane. The playwrights such as Brian Friel, Joe O'Donnell, Tom Murphy etc., that Gemini nurtured were later adopted by the Abbey and other theatres but owe their first productions to the courage of Phyllis Ryan.

Closure
In the mid 1990s, the Eblana was run for a short time by Andrew's Lane Theatre when Gemini moved out of the Eblana in the mid-1980s. Following this it was leased by Northside Theatre Company. It closed in 1995. Despite some erroneous claims (including one that it became a left luggage facility) the theatre is still mostly intact, down to posters and programmes from its last performance.  In 2012 plans were announced to refurbish the theatre, at a cost estimated to be around one million euros, to house the Fry Model Railway, though this plan did not proceed, and as of 2020, the theatre was still closed and disused.

See also

 Eblana (an ancient Irish settlement, traditionally associated with the site of modern Dublin)

References

External links
List of new Irish plays produced at the Eblana Theatre

1995 disestablishments in Ireland
Studio theatres
Former theatres
Theatres completed in 1959
Theatres in Dublin (city)